Carmelo Antonio Lauría Lesseur (24 August 1936 – 29 November 2010) was a Venezuelan businessman, lawyer and politician.

Career 
He served in several ministerial positions for Carlos Andrés Pérez, and was Secretary of the Presidency for Jaime Lusinchi from 1985 to 1988, and Governor of the Federal District (1984–85). He also served as President of the Venezuelan Chamber of Deputies from 1994 to 1996. Among other business positions he was Director of Banco Central de Venezuela and President of Banco de Venezuela, and a board member of Sidor.

Lauría was said to be one of the "Twelve Apostles", a group of Venezuelan businessmen close to President Carlos Andrés Pérez during his first term, Lauria served briefly as Minister for Development in 1974, during the First Presidency of Carlos Andrés Pérez. He was also briefly Interior Minister in 1992 during the Second Presidency of Carlos Andrés Pérez. He obtained a law degree and a doctorate in law from the Andrés Bello Catholic University, and taught there and at the Central University of Venezuela.

References

1936 births
2010 deaths
Andrés Bello Catholic University alumni
20th-century Venezuelan lawyers
Democratic Action (Venezuela) politicians
Academic staff of Andrés Bello Catholic University
Academic staff of the Central University of Venezuela
Venezuelan Ministers of Interior
Presidents of the Venezuelan Chamber of Deputies
Secretariat of the Presidency ministers of Venezuela